The Wawel Cathedral, formally titled the Royal Archcathedral Basilica of Saints Stanislaus and Wenceslaus, is a Roman Catholic cathedral situated on Wawel Hill in Kraków, Poland. Nearly 1000 years old, it is part of the Wawel Castle Complex and is a national sanctuary which served as the coronation site of Polish monarchs.

The current Gothic cathedral is the third edifice on this site; the first was constructed and destroyed in the 11th century and the second one, constructed in the 12th century, was destroyed by a fire in 1305. The construction of the existing church began in the 14th century on the orders of Bishop Nanker. Over time, the building was expanded by successive rulers resulting in its versatile and eclectic architectural composition. There are examples of Romanesque, Gothic, Renaissance, Baroque, Neoclassical and Neogothic elements in the cathedral's façade and interior. The exterior is adorned by side chapels and representative mausoleums, most notable being the golden-domed Sigismund's Chapel.

It is the official seat of the Archbishop of Kraków and of the Archdiocese of Kraków. A symbol of Polish statehood and faith, the cathedral hosts important religious events and annual celebrations. Karol Wojtyła, who in 1978 became Pope John Paul II, the day after his ordination to the priesthood offered his first Mass as a priest at the Wawel Crypt on 2 November 1946, and was ordained Kraków's auxiliary bishop in the cathedral on 28 September 1958.

Interior 
The cathedral comprises a nave with aisles, transepts with aisles, a choir with double aisles, and an apse with ambulatory and radiating chapels. The main altar, located in the apse, was founded about 1650 by Bishop Piotr Gembicki and created by Giovanni Battista Gisleni. The altar painting of Crucified Christ  by Marcin Blechowski is from the 17th century. Over the main altar stands a tall canopy of black marble supported by four pillars, designed by Giovanni Battista Trevano and Matteo Castelli between 1626 and 1629. Underneath the canopy is placed a silver coffin of national patron Stanislaus of Szczepanów (also Stanisław Szczepanowski) created between 1669 and 1671 after the previous one (donated in 1512 by King Sigismund I the Old) was stolen by the Swedes in 1655.

Sigismund's Chapel

Sigismund's Chapel, or Zygmunt Chapel ("Kaplica Zygmuntowska"), adjoining the southern wall of the cathedral, is one of the most notable pieces of architecture in Kraków and perhaps "the purest example of Renaissance architecture outside Italy." Financed by Sigismund I the Old, it was built between 1517 and 1533 by Bartolommeo Berrecci, a Florentine Renaissance architect, who spent most of his career in Poland.

A square-based chapel with a golden dome, it houses the tombs of its founder and those of his children, King Sigismund II Augustus and Anna Jagiellon (Jagiellonka).

Royal chapels and crypts 
The Wawel Cathedral has been the main burial site for Polish monarchs since the 14th century. As such, it has been significantly extended and altered over time as individual rulers have added multiple burial chapels.

The crypts beneath the Wawel Cathedral hold the tombs of Polish kings, national heroes, generals and revolutionaries, including rulers of the Polish–Lithuanian Commonwealth such as John III Sobieski and his consort Marie Casimire (Maria Kazimiera); the remains of Tadeusz Kościuszko, the leader of a Polish national insurrection and Brigadier General in the American Revolutionary War; Władysław Sikorski, Prime Minister of the Polish Government in Exile and Commander-in-Chief of the Polish Armed Forces; Marshal Józef Piłsudski, founder of the Second Polish Republic. Pope John Paul II celebrated his first mass in St. Leonard's Crypt. He considered being buried at the Wawel Cathedral also at one point in time, while some of the people of Poland had hoped that, following ancient custom, his heart would be brought there and kept alongside the remains of the great Polish rulers. (John Paul II was buried under St. Peter's Basilica, a papal burial site since antiquity, instead.)

Crypt of National Poets
Here are buried the national bards: Adam Mickiewicz (laid to rest there in 1890) and Juliusz Słowacki (1927).

Notable burials

Gallery

See also

Notes

References

External links

 Wawel Cathedral official website

Roman Catholic cathedrals in Poland
Cathedral
Cathedral
Basilica churches in Poland
14th-century Roman Catholic church buildings in Poland
Burial sites of the Jagiellonian dynasty
Burial sites of the House of Sobieski
Burial sites of the House of Vasa
Burial sites of the House of Wettin
Burial sites of the Piast dynasty